Lubok Merbau is a state constituency in Perak, Malaysia, that has been represented in the Perak State Legislative Assembly.

Demographics

History

Polling districts
According to the federal gazette issued on 31 October 2022, the Lubok Merbau constituency is divided into 14 polling districts.

Representation history

Election Results

References 

</ref>

Perak state constituencies